Lithuanian Popular Socialist Democratic Party (LSLDP) was a political party in inter-war Lithuania.

History
The LSLDP was formed in 1917 in Voronezh by Mykolas Sleževičius and Felicija Bortkevičienė as a conservative breakaway from the Lithuanian Democratic Party (LDP). When the LDP was dissolved in 1920, its remaining members joined the LSLDP or the Peasant Union, another former breakaway.

In the 1920 elections the LSLDP won 9 seats, emerging as the sixth-largest party in the Seimas. However, the 1922 elections saw the party won only five seats. Shortly after the 1922 elections, on 24 November, the party merged with the Peasant Union to form the Lithuanian Popular Peasants' Union.

References

Political parties of the Russian Revolution
Political parties established in 1917
1922 disestablishments
Political parties disestablished in 1922
Defunct political parties in Lithuania
Socialist parties in Lithuania